Clivina sulcaticeps is a species of ground beetle in the subfamily Scaritinae. It was described by Sloane in 1923.

References

sulcaticeps
Beetles described in 1923